This is a list of the most common passwords, discovered in various data breaches. Common passwords generally are not recommended on account of low password strength.

List

NordPass 
NordPass conducted the most breached passwords research in 2021. The company gathered top 200 worst passwords this year from a database of 275,699,516 passwords.

SplashData
The Worst Passwords List is an annual list of the 25 most common passwords from each year as produced by internet security firm SplashData. Since 2011, the firm has published the list based on data examined from millions of passwords leaked in data breaches, mostly in North America and Western Europe, over each year. In the 2016 edition, the 25 most common passwords made up more than 10% of the surveyed passwords, with the most common password of 2016, "123456", making up 4%.

Keeper
Password manager Keeper compiled its own list of the 25 most common passwords in 2016, from 25 million passwords leaked in data breaches that year.

National Cyber Security Centre
The National Cyber Security Centre (NCSC) compiled its own list of the 20 most common passwords in 2019, from 100 million passwords leaked in data breaches that year.

See also
 Password cracking
 10,000 most common passwords

Notes

References

External links
 Skullsecurity list of breached password collections

Security
Password authentication